The Chicago City Council is the legislative branch of the government of the City of Chicago in Illinois. It consists of 50 alderpersons elected from 50 wards to serve four-year terms. The council is called into session regularly, usually monthly, to consider ordinances, orders, and resolutions whose subject matter includes code changes, utilities, taxes, and many other issues. The Chicago City Council Chambers are located in Chicago City Hall, as are the downtown offices of the individual alderpersons and staff.

The presiding officer of the council is the Mayor of Chicago, who is usually non-voting, except in rare cases, such as to break a tie. The secretary is the City Clerk of Chicago. Both positions are city-wide elected offices. In the absence of the mayor, an alderperson elected to the position of President Pro Tempore serves as the presiding officer.

Originally established as the Common Council in 1837, it was renamed City Council in 1876. The Council assumed its modern form of 50 wards electing one alderperson each in 1923.

Composition

The most recent city council election was the 2019 Chicago aldermanic elections. The current term began on May 20, 2019.

Aldermanic elections are officially nonpartisan; party affiliations below are informational only. Council members also self-organize into caucuses, or blocs that address particular issues. Active caucuses include the Progressive Reform Caucus, the Black Caucus, the Latino Caucus, the LGBT Caucus, and the Democratic Socialist Caucus.

Standing committees 
The city council is internally organized into subject-specific standing committees. Once proposed legislation is drafted, it is assigned to a specific standing committee. After a hearing and deliberation process, the committee votes on whether to report the proposed legislation to the full council, along with recommendations.

The committees are created, and their leaders and members are selected, through a resolution passed by the whole council. Historically, mayors have played a central role selected committee chairs. As of May 2019, there are 18 standing committees in the council, whose chairmen and vice-chairmen are as follows:

History 

Chicago has been divided into wards since 1837, beginning with 6 wards. Until 1923, each ward elected two members to the city council. In 1923, the system that exists today was adopted with 50 wards, each with one council member elected by the ward. In accordance with Illinois state law, ward borders must be shifted after every federal census. This law is intended to give the population of the ward equal representation based by the size of the population of Chicago.

Chicago is unusual among major United States cities in the number of wards and representative alderpersons that it maintains. It has been noted that the current ward system promotes diverse ethnic and cultural representation on the city council.

In June 2021, the state of Illinois adopted a statute using the term "alderperson" to describe City Council members rather than the previous term "alderman". However, many members of City Council said they intended to continue to use the term "alderman" or instead use "alderwoman" or "alder".

Corruption
Chicago City Council Chambers has long been the center of public corruption in Chicago. The first conviction of Chicago alderpersons and Cook County Commissioners for accepting bribes to rig a crooked contract occurred in 1869. Between 1972 and 1999, 26 current or former Chicago alderpersons were convicted for official corruption. Between 1973 and 2012, 31 aldermen were convicted of corruption. Approximately 100 aldermen served in that period, which is a conviction rate of about one-third.

Fourteen of the Chicago's City Council's nineteen committees routinely violated the Illinois Open Meetings Act during the last four months of 2007 by not keeping adequate written records of their meetings. Chicago City Council committees violated the Illinois Open Meetings Act and their own rules by meeting and taking actions without a quorum at least four times over the same four-month span.

Less than half of the Council's 28 committees met more than six times in 1986. The budget for Council committees was $5.3 million in 1986.

Over half of elected Chicago alderpersons took illegal campaign contributions totalling $282,000 in 2013.

Election
Chicago alderpersons are elected by popular vote every four years, on the last Tuesday in February in the year following national mid-term elections. A run-off election, if no candidate garners more than fifty percent of the vote, is held on the first Tuesday in April. The election is held on a non-partisan basis. New terms begin at noon on the third Monday in May following the election.

Authority and roles

The council, in conjunction with the Mayor of Chicago, hears recommendations from the Commission on Chicago Landmarks and then may grant individual properties Chicago Landmark status. The Council also has the power to redraw ward boundaries, resulting in the heavily gerrymandered map seen today.

Law

The Journal of the Proceedings of the City Council of the City of Chicago is the official publication of the acts of the City Council. The Municipal Code of Chicago is the codification of Chicago's local ordinances of a general and permanent nature. Between May 18, 2011, and August 2011, the first 100 days of the first term of Mayor Rahm Emanuel, 2,845 ordinances and orders were introduced to the Council.

Aldermanic privilege 
Chicago's alderpersons are generally given exceptional deference, called "aldermanic privilege" or "aldermanic prerogative", to control city decisions and services within their ward. This is an unwritten and informal practice that emerged in the early 20th century and gives alderman control over "zoning, licenses, permits, property-tax reductions, city contracts and patronage jobs" in their wards. Political scientists have suggested that this facilitates corruption. The system has been described as "50 aldermen serving essentially as mayors of 50 wards."

See also

 Council Wars, a period of conflict within the City Council
 Cook County Board of Commissioners
 Workingmen's Party of Illinois
 11th Ward, Chicago
 Aldermanic elections in Chicago
 Chicago Aldermanic Black Caucus
 Chicago City Council Democratic Socialist Caucus
 Chicago City Council Latino Caucus
 Chicago City Council LGBT Caucus
 Chicago City Council Progressive Reform Caucus
 List of Chicago aldermen since 1923

Notes

References

External links
 Chicago City Council
 Chicago City Council legislation from the City Clerk of Chicago
 Chicago City Council calendar from the City Clerk of Chicago
 Journal of the Proceedings (c. 1981–present) from the City Clerk of Chicago
 Journal of the Proceedings (c. 1908) from Google Books
 Chicago City Council meeting reports from the City Clerk of Chicago
 Map of Chicago Wards
 Your City Council: Who's who and what they can do from the Chicago Reader
 The Untold Stories of Alderman Don Parrillo  by Anthony DeBartolo, Hyde Park Media
 Chicago City Council archive at the Chicago Reader

 
1837 establishments in Illinois